Pagetoid reticulosis (also known as "acral mycoses fungoides", "localized epidermotropic reticulosis", "mycosis fungoides palmaris et plantaris", "unilesional mycosis fungoides", and "Woringer–Kolopp disease") is a cutaneous condition, an uncommon lymphoproliferative disorder, sometimes considered a form of mycosis fungoides.

Symptoms and Signs 
Lesions emerge as well-demarcated psoriasiform or hyperkeratotic patches and plaques, with a central clearing and an elevated border. Pagetoid reticulosis is a very slow progressive variant of mycosis fungoides and is usually localized unlike the latter.

Treatment 
The most common method of treatment includes radiotherapy and/or surgical excision.

See also 
 Pagetoid
 Cutaneous T-cell lymphoma
 List of cutaneous conditions

References

External links 

Lymphoid-related cutaneous conditions